Sweet Bells is the first Christmas album by English contemporary folk musician Kate Rusby, released on 15 December 2008 on Pure Records. In November 2011, Rusby released a follow-up, entitled While Mortals Sleep (2011).

The album was re-released on 9 November 2009 featuring new cover artwork by Marie Mills. Sweet Bells, the carol featured on the album, is a carol peculiar to Yorkshire, based on the carol While Shepherds Watched Their Flocks by Night but with an alternative tune and extra lyrics.

Track listing
 "Here We Come A-Wassailing" - 3:09
 "Sweet Bells" - 3:34
 "Poor Old Horse" - 3:45
 "Hark the Herald" - 4:29
 "The Holly and the Ivy" - 3:21
 "Hark, Hark, What News" - 3:21
 "Candlemas Eve" - 5:18
 "Hail Chime On" - 4:12
 "Serving Girl's Holiday" - 4:37
 "Awake Arise Good Christians" - 3:42
 "The Miner's Dream of Home" - 4:39

References

Kate Rusby albums
2008 Christmas albums
Christmas albums by English artists
Folk Christmas albums